Charlotte Lysès (1877-1956) was a French stage and film actress.

Selected filmography
 La dame de chez Maxim's (1933)
 The Last Waltz (1936)
 The Brighton Twins (1936)

References

Bibliography
 Capua, Michelangelo. Anatole Litvak: The Life and Films. McFarland, 2015.

External links

1877 births
1956 deaths
French stage actresses
French film actresses
Actresses from Paris